"Breaking Up Is Hard to Do" is a song recorded by Neil Sedaka, co-written by Sedaka and Howard Greenfield. Sedaka recorded this song twice, in 1962 and 1975, in two significantly different arrangements, and it is considered to be his signature song. Between 1970 and 1975, it was a top-40 hit three separate times for three separate artists: Lenny Welch, The Partridge Family and Sedaka's second version.

Original version

In his daily mini-concert on June 12, 2020, Sedaka recalled that the song's iconic scat intro ("come-a come-a down, dooby doo down down") was a result of him and Greenfield being unable to come up with a lyric for that section of the song and Sedaka improvising a vocalise, which they liked so much that they kept it in the finished product.

Described by AllMusic as "two minutes and sixteen seconds of pure pop magic," "Breaking Up Is Hard to Do" hit number one on the Billboard Hot 100 on August 11, 1962, and peaked at number twelve on the Hot R&B Sides chart. The single was a solid hit all over the world, reaching number 7 in the UK, sometimes with the text translated into foreign languages. For example, the Italian version was called "Tu non lo sai" ("You Don't Know") and was recorded by Sedaka himself.

On this version, background vocals on the song are performed by the female group The Cookies.

The personnel on the original recording session included: Al Casamenti, Art Ryerson, and Charles Macy on guitar; Ernie Hayes on piano; George Duvivier on bass; Gary Chester on drums; Artie Kaplan on saxophone; George Devens and Phil Kraus on percussion; Seymour Barab and Morris Stonzek on cellos; and David Gulliet, Joseph H. Haber, Harry Kohon, David Sackson, and Louis Stone on violins.

Chart history

Weekly charts

Year-end charts

Lenny Welch version
Though it was originally an uptempo song, Lenny Welch re-recorded the song, reimagined as a torch ballad. Welch had approached Sedaka to see if he had any songs in his repertoire that fit Welch's style; as most of the songs Sedaka had written with his usual partner Howard Greenfield were upbeat pop songs, he did not, but playing around on the piano, he discovered "Breaking Up is Hard to Do" worked well as a slow ballad, so he wrote a new introduction and offered it to Welch. It peaked at #34 on the US Billboard charts and #8 on the easy listening chart in January 1970. It was Welch's third and final top-40 pop hit, and his first since 1964.

Sedaka's 1975 version

Five years after Welch's successful cover, Sedaka, in the midst of a comeback in his native United States after several years in career decline and a detour through the United Kingdom, re-recorded his signature song in the same style that Welch used.  The song begins with the first few bars of Sedaka's 1962 recording, before fading and segueing into the slow version.  Sedaka's slow version peaked at #8 in February 1976 and went to number one on the Easy Listening chart. It was only the second time that an artist made the Billboard Top Ten with two different versions of the same song.  Sedaka has credited Welch's song "Since I Fell for You" as well as The Showmen and Dinah Washington as his inspiration for the new rendition.

Chart performance

Weekly charts

Year-end charts

The Partridge Family version

Apart from Sedaka's own reworking of the song, by far the most successful cover of "Breaking Up Is Hard to Do" was done by the Partridge Family in 1972.  While only a medium hit in North America, their version reached number 3 in both the UK and Australia.  Their version was never released in stereo until the 2013 Bell/Legacy release, "Playlist: The Very Best of the Partridge Family".

Chart performance

Weekly charts

Year-end charts

Notable cover versions
"Breaking Up Is Hard to Do" has been covered by numerous other artists over the years, including a version by The Happenings, whose version charted at number 67 on the US Billboard Hot 100 in 1968.

See also
List of Hot 100 number-one singles of 1962 (U.S.)
List of number-one adult contemporary singles of 1976 (U.S.)

References

External links
  (1962)
  (1975)
 

1962 songs
1962 singles
1972 singles
1975 singles
Doo-wop songs
Songs with lyrics by Howard Greenfield
Songs written by Neil Sedaka
Neil Sedaka songs
Paul Anka songs
The Carpenters songs
The Four Seasons (band) songs
Tom Jones (singer) songs
Carole King songs
The Partridge Family songs
Shelley Fabares songs
The Marbles (duo) songs
Andy Williams songs
Billboard Hot 100 number-one singles
Cashbox number-one singles
Number-one singles in Canada
Number-one singles in New Zealand
RPM Top Singles number-one singles
The Rocket Record Company singles
Polydor Records singles
RCA Victor singles